Tawi may refer to:

 Tawi River, India
 Tawi Sli (1912–1987), second chief minister of Sarawak, Malaysia
 Tawi-Tawi Province, Philippines
 Tawitawi Island, Philippines

See also
 Tavi (disambiguation)
 Tiwi (disambiguation)
 Tiwa (disambiguation)